Michael Morris Cassidy (born May 10, 1937) is a Canadian politician. He served in the Legislative Assembly of Ontario from 1971 to 1984, and in the House of Commons of Canada from 1984 to 1988. Cassidy was the leader of the New Democratic Party of Ontario from 1978 to 1982.

Background
Cassidy was born in Victoria, British Columbia, the son of Beatrice Pearce and Harry Cassidy, who was a founding member of the Co-operative Commonwealth Federation, a one time candidate for the leadership of the Ontario Liberal Party and dean of the School of Social Work at the University of Toronto. After graduating from the University of Toronto Schools, he attended the University of Trinity College in the University of Toronto, and the London School of Economics. Cassidy worked as a journalist before entering political life, and was bureau chief of the Financial Times in Ottawa for a period.

Politics
Cassidy was elected as an Ottawa alderman in January 1970. The following year, he was elected to the Ontario legislature for Ottawa Centre in the 1971 provincial election. Cassidy defeated Progressive Conservative candidate Garry Guzzo, who later served in the legislature from 1995 to 2003, by 182 votes. He did not immediately resign from his council seat, and held both positions until the provincial government banned concurrent tenure in 1972. Cassidy was re-elected with an increased majority in the 1975 election, in which the NDP under Stephen Lewis reduced the Conservatives to a minority government and became the official opposition in the legislature.

The NDP fell back to third place, behind the Liberal Party, in the 1977 provincial election, and Lewis resigned as leader the following year. Cassidy entered the contest to succeed him and defeated Ian Deans and Michael Breaugh in February 1978. He had a difficult job following Lewis, who was a charismatic and dynamic figure. Cassidy, by comparison, had a rather dry personality. He was also the most left-wing of the three leadership candidates, and was not fully trusted by the party establishment.  Cassidy's policy advisor in the leadership campaign was James Laxer, a former leader of The Waffle NDP faction which had separated from the party in 1974. Some members of the NDP caucus considered his election as a serious mistake, and encouraged him to resign before contesting an election. Cassidy ignored this advice, and remained as leader.

The NDP fared poorly in the 1981 election, falling from 33 seats to 21. Their decline allowed the Progressive Conservatives to regain a majority government, while the Liberals neither gained nor lost seats. Cassidy faced a difficult re-election in Ottawa Centre, and defeated Progressive Conservative candidate David Small by only 599 votes. He stepped down as leader after the campaign, and was replaced in 1982 by Bob Rae. Donald C. MacDonald, another former NDP leader, would later describe Cassidy's leadership as "an unhappy interlude for both him and the party". (MacDonald, The Happy Warrior, p. 186.)

Cassidy then resigned as Member of Provincial Parliament (MPP) in 1984 to enter national politics.  He campaigned for the federal New Democratic Party in the 1984 election, and defeated Progressive Conservative candidate Dan Chilcott by 54 votes to win the Ottawa Centre riding.  He was defeated in the 1988 election, losing to Liberal Mac Harb by 762 votes.

Cassidy was appointed to the board of directors of Ontario Hydro in the early 1990s, during Bob Rae's tenure as premier. He was fired without notice on January 10, 1996 by the Progressive Conservative government of Mike Harris, but was reinstated by a court order on January 19.  Cassidy opposed the Harris government's plan to restructure and partially privatize the crown corporation, and remained a director until 1997.

Electoral record

Later life
In 2005, Cassidy has become involved in a battle to protect Tay River and the surrounding area from exploitation by multinational developers. He published an essay on the controversy in October 2005.  Cassidy has also operated the Ottawa-based Ginger Group Consultants firm, providing lobbying, strategic planning and public relations work for labour organizations and related groups.

He was elected to Council in the Township of Lanark Highlands in 2003 but was defeated in 2006.

References

External links

1937 births
Alumni of the London School of Economics
Canadian socialists
Canadian Unitarian Universalists
Leaders of the Ontario New Democratic Party
Living people
Members of the House of Commons of Canada from Ontario
New Democratic Party MPs
Ontario New Democratic Party MPPs
Ottawa city councillors
Politicians from Victoria, British Columbia
Trinity College (Canada) alumni
University of Toronto alumni
Upper Canada College alumni

sv:Michael Cassidy